This is a list of notable singers, dancers and actors who married titled Britons (nobility and royalty).
This list includes only those who contracted marriages.

Anastasia Robinson and the Earl of Peterborough (1724) 
Lavinia Fenton and the Duke of Bolton (1751)
Elizabeth Farren and the Earl of Derby (1797) 
Louisa Brunton and Earl Craven (1807) 
Mary "Polly" Bolton and Lord Thurlow (1813)
Elizabeth O'Neill and William Wrixon-Becher (1819)
Mary Anne Paton and Lord William Lennox (1824)
Harriet Mellon and the Duke of St Albans (1827)
Maria Foote and the Earl of Harrington (1831)
Catherine "Kitty" Stephens and the Earl of Essex (1838)
 Frances Braham and Earl Waldegrave (1840)
Mrs Nisbett and Sir William Boothby, 8th Baronet (1844)
Sarah Fairbrother and the Duke of Cambridge (1847)
Julia Fortescue and Baron Gardner (1848)
Emily Saunders and Sir William Don (1857) 
Anne Sheppey and Viscount Hinton (1869)
Kate Cooke and the Earl of Euston (1871)
"Dolly Tester" and the profligate Marquess of Ailesbury (1884)
Belle Bilton and the Earl of Clancarty (1889)
Constance "Connie" Gilchrist and the seventh Earl of Orkney (1892)
May Yohé and Lord Francis Hope (1894)
Rosie Boote and the Marquis of Headfort (1901)
Anna Robinson and the Earl of Rosslyn (1905)
Louise Robey and Earl of Burford (1994)
A. J. Langer and the Earl of Devon (2004)
Sophie Winkleman and Lord Frederick Windsor (2009)
Meghan Markle and the Duke of Sussex (2018)

References

Notes 

Entertainers
Entertainers
Great Britain-related lists